{{Speciesbox
| name = European hamster
| status = CR
| status_system = IUCN3.1
| status_ref = 
| genus = Cricetus
| parent_authority = Leske, 1779
| species = cricetus
| authority = (Linnaeus, 1758)
| image = Hamster.jpg
| image_caption = Hamster photographed at Vienna Central Cemetery
| range_map = CricetusCricetusIUCN.svg
| range_map_caption = European hamster range (green)
| synonyms = {{collapsible list
|Cricetus albus 
|Cricetus babylonicus 
|Cricetus canescens 
|Cricetus frumentarius 
|Cricetus fulvus 
|Cricetus fuscidorsis 
|Cricetus germanicus 
|Cricetus jeudii 
|Cricetus latycranius 
|Cricetus nehringi' 
|Cricetus niger 
|Cricetus nigricans 
|Cricetus polychroma 
|Cricetus rufescens 
|Cricetus stavropolicus 
|Cricetus tauricus 
|Cricetus tomensis 
|Cricetus varius 
|Cricetus vulgaris 
|Mus cricetus }}
| synonyms_ref = 
}}

The European hamster (Cricetus cricetus), also known as the Eurasian hamster,  black-bellied hamster or common hamster, is the only species of hamster in the genus Cricetus. It is native to grassland and similar habitats in a large part of Eurasia, extending from Belgium to the Altai Mountains and Yenisey River in Russia. Historically, it was considered a farmland pest and had been trapped for its fur. Its population has declined drastically in recent years and is now considered critically endangered. The main threats to the species are thought to be intensive agriculture, habitat destruction, and persecution by farmers.

Description

The European hamster has brown dorsal fur with white patches. The chest and belly are black. The tail is short and furred. It is much larger than the Syrian (Mesocricetus auratus) or dwarf hamsters (Phodopus'' sp.), which are commonly kept as pets, and is the largest known species of hamster. In captivity, the European hamster has an unusually long lifespan for a rodent, living up to eight years.

Behaviour
The common hamster is a nocturnal or crepuscular species. It lives in a complex burrow system. It eats seeds, legumes, root vegetables, grasses and insects. It transports its food in its elastic cheek pouches to the food storage chambers. It hibernates between October and March. During this time, it wakes every five to seven days to feed from the storage chambers. They are usually solitary animals.

Breeding 
The adults reach sexual maturity when they are about 43 days old and breed from early April to August. The gestation period is 18–20 days and the size of the litter ranges from three to 15 young, which are weaned when aged three weeks.

Distribution and habitat
It is typically found in low-lying farmland with soft loam or loess soils, although it may also inhabit meadows, gardens or hedges. It is found from Belgium and Alsace in the west, to Russia in the east, and Bulgaria in the south. A significant population is found in Vienna's Central Cemetery in Austria.

Conservation 
The Court of Justice of the European Union, the European Union's highest court, ruled in 2011 that France had failed to protect the European hamster. The government would be subject to fines of up to $24.6 million if France did not adjust its agricultural and urbanisation policies sufficiently to protect it. By 2014, France had started a captive-breeding programme, which aimed to release 500 European hamsters each year into fields that farmers were paid not to harvest.

In 2020, the European hamster was classified as critically endangered across its global range on the IUCN Red List. The reasons for its drastic decline are not fully understood. It has been linked especially to habitat loss due to intensive agricultural practices and the building of roads that fragment populations, and to climate change, the historical fur trapping and to pollution; even light pollution appears to significantly reduce local populations, unless counterbalanced by other factors. Agriculture, development, and persecution are thought to be the biggest threats to the species.

A significant benefit to existing conservation programs is that the European hamster breeds readily in captivity; captive breeding programs for the species exist in Belgium, France, Germany, Poland, Ukraine and elsewhere.

References

External links 
 
 

Hamsters
Rodents of Europe
Rodents of Asia
Critically endangered biota of Europe
Mammals described in 1758
Taxa named by Carl Linnaeus